Larm may refer to:
 Lärm, Dutch band
 Larm, Susan, Khuzestan Province, Iran